The 2017 Campeonato Brasileiro Série C, the third level of the Brazilian League, was contested by 20 clubs. The competition started on 14 May and ended on 21 October 2017.

CSA, Fortaleza, Sampaio Corrêa and São Bento qualified for the semi-finals and were promoted to the 2018 Campeonato Brasileiro Série B.

CSA won the title after defeating Fortaleza in the final.

Teams

Number of teams by state

Personnel

Group stage
In the group stage, each group was played on a home-and-away round-robin basis. The teams were ranked according to points (3 points for a win, 1 point for a draw, and 0 points for a loss). If tied on points, the following criteria would be used to determine the ranking: 1. Wins; 2. Goal difference; 3. Goals scored; 4. Head-to-head (if the tie is only between two teams).  If tied on aggregate, the away goals rule would be used (except if both teams share the same stadium); 5. Fewest red cards; 6. Fewest yellow cards; 7. Draw in the headquarters of the Brazilian Football Confederation (Regulations Article 14).

Group A

Group B

Final Stage
In the final stage, each tie was played on a home-and-away two-legged basis. If tied on aggregate, the away goals rule would be used. If still tied, extra time would not be played, and the penalty shoot-out would be used to determine the winner (Regulations Article 15).

Bracket

Quarter-finals
The matches were played between 16 and 25 September.

Group C

Sampaio Corrêa won 2–1 on aggregate and advanced to the semi-finals

Group D

Fortaleza won 2–1 on aggregate and advanced to the semi-finals

Group E

CSA won 3–0 on aggregate and advanced to the semi-finals

Group F

São Bento won 2–0 on aggregate and advanced to the semi-finals

Semi-finals

Semi-finals seedings

The matches were played between 1 and 7 October.

Group G

Fortaleza won 3–2 on aggregate and advanced to the Finals

Group H

Tied 1–1 on aggregate, CSA won on penalties and advanced to the Finals

Finals

Finals seedings

The matches were played on 14 and 21 October.

Group I

References 

Campeonato Brasileiro Série C seasons
3